Galym Izbasaruly Orazbakov (Ğalym Izbasarūly Orazbaqov; born in 1964) has served as the Minister of Industry and Trade in the Government of Kazakhstan since he replaced Vladimir Shkolnik on 10 January 2007 in a political shakeup.

He previously served as President of Kazakhstan Engineering National Company, the state-owned arms-exporting company, and as the Deputy Minister of Industry and Trade.

References

1964 births
Living people
Government ministers of Kazakhstan
Ambassadors of Kazakhstan to Israel
Ambassadors of Kazakhstan to Russia